Joseph Charles Molland (born 21 June 1947, Edge Hill, Liverpool) is an English songwriter and rock guitarist whose recording career spans five decades. He is best known as a member of Badfinger, the most successful of the acts he performed with.  Molland is the last surviving member from the band's classic line-up. He lives in Minneapolis, Minnesota.

Career
Originally a member of several rock groups around Liverpool, such as The Assassins and The Profiles, Molland began his recording career in 1965 when he joined The Masterminds. This group released a single on Immediate Records IM 005, consisting of a cover version of Bob Dylan's  "She Belongs to Me" backed with a band original, "Taken My Love". After this the group disbanded and Molland joined the backing group of The Merseys. Although never recording with them, he did accompany them on tour.

Molland's recording career began in earnest in 1967 when he joined Gary Walker (formerly of the Walker Brothers) for the group 'Gary Walker & The Rain'. The Rain released several singles, an EP, and an album on the Polydor and Philips labels in the UK and Japan between 1967 and 1969. Titled #1, the album featured four Molland songs and was especially well received in Japan, but a lack of success in their UK homebase caused the band to disband by 1969.

In November 1969, Molland auditioned for The Iveys and was hired. The Iveys were a conspicuous recording group at the time of Apple Records (a label launched by the Beatles). The Iveys changed their name to "Badfinger", then dismissed original bassist Ron Griffiths, moving guitarist Tommy Evans to bass, and starting Molland as guitarist. The group continued an early string of successful singles and albums for the next couple of years. During Molland's association with Apple, he made guest appearances on two George Harrison albums, All Things Must Pass and The Concert For Bangla Desh, and the John Lennon album, Imagine. 

Molland left Badfinger in late 1974 due to disagreements over management. In 1975, he joined with Jerry Shirley (formerly of Humble Pie) and formed a group called Natural Gas. The band released their self-titled album on Private Stock Records in 1976, and enjoyed a successful tour with Peter Frampton the following year. According to Molland, a general lack of organisation led to the band's demise late in 1977.

Molland and former Badfinger bandmate Tom Evans recorded two albums under the Badfinger name, Airwaves in 1978, and Say No More in 1981. He and Evans split after Say No More and the two performed in rival touring Badfinger bands until Evans' suicide in 1983.

Molland's career since 1983 has been with various rock groups and duos, and performing tours under the Badfinger name or as "Joey Molland's Badfinger". Earlier versions of these groups sometimes included original Badfinger drummer Mike Gibbins. Molland was instrumental in releasing a 1974 live recording of Badfinger on Rykodisc in 1991, called Day After Day: Live, which received mixed critical reactions due to overdubbing and a rearranged track order.

Molland's solo recordings have been well received. His first, After The Pearl, was released in 1983 on Earthtone Records. His second, The Pilgrim, was released in 1992 on Rykodisc. His third, This Way Up, was independently released in 2001. His 2013 album, Return To Memphis, was released on 13 December.  His latest album Be True To Yourself on Omnivore Recordings was released 12 July 2021, featuring the single ″Rainy Day Man."

Molland went back into the studio in 2015 with members of 10,000 Maniacs (Ladies First) to release a new version on the classic song, "Sweet Tuesday Morning" from Badfinger's 1972 album Straight Up. The collaboration, in partnership with HAIL! Fredonia Records of the State University of New York at Fredonia has aimed to "expand support to those in need of help and increase community empowerment" with proceeds supporting global non-for-profit organization, WhyHunger.

In late 2019 Molland toured with Todd Rundgren, Jason Scheff, Micky Dolenz and Christopher Cross in celebration of the Beatles' self-titled double album, under the banner "It Was Fifty Years Ago Today – A Tribute to the Beatles’ White Album". Molland performed the Badfinger songs "Baby Blue" and "No Matter What".

Personal life
Molland lives in Minnesota with his girlfriend and her son. He has two grown children, Joseph Charles III and Shaun. He continues to tour under the name Joey Molland's Badfinger.

Discography

With The Masterminds
"She Belongs to Me" (1965 single)

With Gary Walker & The Rain
Album No. 1 (1968)

With Badfinger
No Dice (1970)
Straight Up (1971)
Ass (1973)
Badfinger (1974)
Wish You Were Here (1974)
Airwaves (1979)
Say No More (1981)

With Natural Gas
Natural Gas (1976)

Solo
After The Pearl (1983)
The Pilgrim (1992)
Basil (also known as "Demo's Old and New") (1997)
This Way Up (2001)
Return to Memphis (2013)
Be True to Yourself (2020)

As a guest artist
The Concert For Bangla Desh (album)
All Things Must Pass by George Harrison (album)
Imagine by John Lennon (album)
Victory Gardens (1991) with folk-duo John & Mary
Wear A New Face by Tim Schools (2008 album; produced by Molland)
Love Her by Tim Schools (2015 album; produced by Molland)

Songs of note
"I Don't Mind" (album track, No Dice co-written with Tom Evans, by Badfinger)

"Better Days" (album track, No Dice co-written with Tom Evans, by Badfinger)

"Watford John" (album track, No Dice co-written with Tom Evans, Mike Gibbins, Pete Ham, by Badfinger)

"Sweet Tuesday Morning" (album track, Straight Up by Badfinger)

"Sometimes" (album track, Straight Up by Badfinger)

"Give It Up" (album track, Badfinger)

"Andy Norris" (album track, Badfinger)

"Meanwhile Back at the Ranch/Should I Smoke" (album track, Wish You Were Here LP, co-written by Pete Ham, by Badfinger)

"Love Is Gonna Come at Last" (Billboard chart No. 69 by Badfinger)

"No One Likes The Rain" (album track, The Pilgrim)

"This Time" (album track, Be True to Yourself by Joey Molland)

References

External links
Official Badfinger Site

1947 births
Living people
English male singer-songwriters
English male guitarists
Badfinger members
English rock guitarists
British expatriates in the United States
Musicians from Liverpool
Rhythm guitarists
People from Edge Hill
The Merseybeats members
World Classic Rockers members